Arhochmus is a monotypic genus of worms belonging to the family Prosorhochmidae. The only species is Arhochmus korotneffi.

The species is found in North America.

References

Nemerteans